First Single may refer to:

The First (single album) by NCT Dream, 2017
Big Bang (2006 single album), also known as Big Bang First Single
"The First Single", a song by The Format from Interventions + Lullabies, 2003